Yellow bush frog may refer to:

 Coorg yellow bush frog (Raorchestes luteolus), a frog in the family Rhacophoridae endemic to the Western Ghats, India, in the state of Karnataka
 Kalpatta yellow bush frog (Raorchestes nerostagona), a frog in the family Rhacophoridae endemic to the Western Ghats, India

Animal common name disambiguation pages